Afia Serena Nathaniel (born 1974) is an independent Pakistani filmmaker who works primarily as a writer, director, producer and editor. She is a graduate of the Film Division at the Columbia University School of the Arts (2006).

Early life
Afia Nathaniel was born in Quetta, Pakistan. She is the eldest of three girls. Her father was in the Armed Forces and her mother a professor of English. Afia was brought up and educated in Lahore.

Education
Afia did her Senior Cambridge from Convent of Jesus and Mary, Lahore. She then attended Kinnaird College from 1991 to 1994, graduating with a BSc degree. She majored in Mathematics with a minor in Physics. In college, Afia participated actively in debating forums, poetry competitions and dramatics. She was elected the President of Science Club by the students at Kinnaird. Afia was awarded the prestigious Mangat Rai Gold Medal in 1994 in recognition of her outstanding academic record and extracurricular achievements.

In August 1994, Afia joined Lahore University of Management Sciences (LUMS) to pursue a BSc in Computer Science. She graduated from LUMS in 1997.

In 2001, Columbia University offered Afia Nathaniel a two-year Dean's fellowship to come and join their MFA Film programme. Afia won several accolades for her short films which spurred the growth of New Wave of Pakistani independent cinema.

Early career
In the absence of any film schools in Pakistan, Afia Nathaniel, joined Publicis Pakistan (formerly Headstart) and began a career in advertising soon after graduating from LUMS. She was quickly promoted to head the Creative Department at Publicis Pakistan.

In 1999, Afia left Pakistan to work with the World YWCA, an international women's non-profit organisation based in Geneva, Switzerland. She attended the UN Commission on Human Rights from 1999 to 2001 and worked with women in over 100 countries in the areas of peace, justice, health, human rights and environment. Afia was appointed as the Communications Manager for the endowment campaign of the World YWCA.

Film career
In 2008, Afia founded Zambeel Films, a film production company in Pakistan, specialising in producing local independent films for a global audience. Afia is a member of Film Fatales independent women filmmakers.
 Dukhtar (2014)

Personal life
Afia is currently based in New York City she teaches in the visual arts department at Princeton University. She lives with her husband and daughter .

Awards
Film Awards/Honours/Grants
 2015 Best Film Director – Dukhtar (awaiting result)
 2010 NYFA Geri Ashur Screenwriting Award
 2006 Milos Forman Finishing Fund
 2006 Hollywood Foreign Press Association Grant
 2005 IFP Market Screenplay Award
 2005 Ezra Litwak Award for Distinction in Screenwriting at the Columbia University Film School Student Film Festival
 2005 HBO Development Award
 2005 Finalist, Tribeca Connect, New York
 2003 Nadah, Nominee Golden Reel Award, VC Filmfest

Academic Awards/Fellowships/Grants
 2004-6 World Studio Foundation Fellow
 2003-4 AAUW International Fellow
 2003-4 MMMF (James Wolfensohn) Fellow, World Bank
 2003-4 WIL Fellow, International House, New York
 2001-3 Dean's Fellow, School of Arts, Columbia University, New York
 1994 Mangat Rai Gold Medal, Kinnaird College, Lahore, Pakistan

Film festivals
 Nadah (Short Film) – Director, Producer, Editor 
 International Film Festival Rotterdam, 2003 (World Premiere)
 Reel-World Film Festival, Toronto, 2003 (Canadian Premiere)
 Clermont-Ferrand Film Market 2003
 19th VC FilmFest, Los Angeles, 2003 (Nominee Golden Reel Award)
 9th International Film Festival Dortmund, Germany 2003
 Anthology Film Archive, New York, 2003
 Commonwealth International Film Festival 2003 (UK Premiere)
 1st Asian Pacific Short-Film Festival 2003 Barcelona (Spain Premiere)
 9th Asian Film Festival, 2003, Lyon (French Premiere)
 3rd KaraFilmFestival, 2003, Karachi, Pakistan (Pakistan Premiere)
 Cinemasia, 2004, Netherlands
 Mateela Film Festival, 2004, Lahore, Pakistan (Lahore Premiere)

Toba Tek Singh (Short Film) – Writer, director, producer, editor, Executive Producer
 New York Asian American International film festival 2005 (World Premiere)
 VC FilmFest 2006, Los Angeles, US (American Premiere)

Long After... (Muntazir) (Short Film) – Writer, director, producer, editor, Executive Producer
 Montreal World Cinema Film Festival 2007
 ReelWorld Film Festival, Toronto, 2008
 Clermont-Ferrand Short Film Market 2008
 Asian American International Film Festival, New York, 2008
 New Jersey International Film Festival 2008

Butterfly (Short Film) – Writer
 Asia-Expo film festival, Lyon France (Winner Audience Choice Award)
 Napa Valley Wine Country Film Fest (Winner Best International Short Film)
 Black Maria Film Festival 2003 (Winner Honourable Mention)
 Ivy Film Festival 2003 (Winner best graduate student film)
 19th VC Film Fest, LA, 2003 (Nominee Golden Reel Award)
 San Francisco International Film Festival 2003
 Mumbai International Film Festival, 2003
 Palm Springs Short Film Festival, 2003
 Hawaii International Film Festival, 2003
 Greenwich Film Festival, 2003
 Indian Film Festival of Los Angeles, 2003
 San Francisco International Asian American Film Festival, 2003
 Vancouver Asian Film Festival, 2003
 Cinema Paradiso Film Festival, 2003
 ACV New York Asian American Film Festival, 2003
 San Diego Asian Film Festival, 2003
 DC Asian Pacific American Film Festival, 2003
 Dallas Asian American Film Festival, 2003

Awards & nominations

References

External links
 

Living people
1974 births
American film directors
American people of Pakistani descent
Punjabi people
Pakistani screenwriters
Pakistani film producers
Lahore University of Management Sciences alumni
Convent of Jesus and Mary, Lahore alumni
Film directors from Lahore
Kinnaird College for Women University alumni
Columbia University School of the Arts alumni